In mathematics, the prime ideal theorem may be 

 the Boolean prime ideal theorem
 the Landau prime ideal theorem on number fields